The 1964 football season was São Paulo's 35th season since club's existence.

Statistics

Overall
{|class="wikitable"
|-
|Games played || 63 (9 Torneio Rio-São Paulo, 30 Campeonato Paulista, 24 Friendly match)
|-
|Games won ||29  (1 Torneio Rio-São Paulo, 12 Campeonato Paulista, 16 Friendly match)
|-
|Games drawn ||16  (2 Torneio Rio-São Paulo, 9 Campeonato Paulista, 5 Friendly match)
|-
|Games lost ||18  (6 Torneio Rio-São Paulo, 9 Campeonato Paulista, 3 Friendly match)
|-
|Goals scored || 115
|-
|Goals conceded || 86
|-
|Goal difference || +29
|-
|Best result || 6–0 (H) v XV de Piracicaba - Campeonato Paulista - 1964.12.02
|-
|Worst result || 1–5 (A) v Santos - Campeonato Paulista - 1964.07.19
|-
|Most appearances || 
|-
|Top scorer || 
|-

Friendlies

I Torneo Internacional de El Salvador

Torneo Internacional Ciudad de Mexico

II Torneo Internacional de El Salvador

Coppa Città di Firenze

Official competitions

Torneio Rio-São Paulo

Record

Campeonato Paulista

Record

External links 
 Official website 

Sao Paulo
1964